The 2022–23 Niagara Purple Eagles men's ice hockey season was the 27th season of play for the program, the 25th at the Division I level, and the 13th in the Atlantic Hockey conference. The Purple Eagles represented Niagara University and were coached by Jason Lammers, in his 6th season.

Season
The Purple Eagles kicked off their season with a trip west that resulted in a surprise sweep of Omaha. While riding high on the rare victories, the defense slipped after the team returned home and allowed nearly 5 goals against per game over the next five games. Niagara recovered by the end of October and then went on a 5-game winning streak to pull themselves out of the Atlantic Hockey cellar. Due to expected heavy snowfall in the Buffalo area, the game against St. Lawrence was moved from November 19 to January 5.

Niagara ended the first half of the season with a sluggish performance by their offense but they still possessed a winning record. The Purple Eagles opened the second half by splitting a pair of non-conference series. Unfortunately, the team remained inconsistent for the remainder of the year. While they were able to sweep a ranked RIT squad, they were in turn dropped by both Bentley and Holy Cross in the back half of the year. The result was that Niagara finished 6th in the conference standings despite seeing improvements across the board.

The team began the postseason on the road and dropped the first match to Sacred Heart. Afterwards, Chad Veltri turned in a masterful performance in goal and allowed just 4 goals on 70 shots. Carter Randklev's 5-point effort in the deciding game sent the Purple Eagles into the semifinal where the team faced local rival Canisius. Veltri continued to stand on his head and led the Purple Eagles to a 2–1 victory over the Golden Griffins. Ordinarily, that would have been enough to send the team to the league championship, however, Atlantic Hockey had changed the playoff format prior to the season. WHile the First Round games had been eliminated, the semifinal round was extended to be a best-of-three series like the quarterfinal. This meant that Niagara had to win a second match against Canisius to advance. Unfortunately, the Griffins were able to rally from the loss in game 1 and stormed back with two wins to knock Niagara out of the postseason.

While the end of their campaign was disappointing, the team had taken a big stride forward. Niagara had scored 37 more goals and though they allowed 7 more goals against, they had done so in 4 additional games. The Purple Eagles also posted their first winning season in a decade; a successful season despite the ending.

Departures

Recruiting

Roster
As of June 30, 2022.

Standings

Schedule and results

|-
!colspan=12 style=";" | Regular Season

|-
!colspan=12 style=";" |

Scoring statistics

Goaltending statistics

Rankings

Note: USCHO did not release a poll in weeks 1, 13, or 26.

References

2022–23
Niagara Purple Eagles
Niagara Purple Eagles
2023 in sports in New York (state)
2022 in sports in New York (state)